Qualifying for the 2019 Rugby World Cup for Africa Rugby began in June 2016, with 14 teams competing. On 18 August 2018, Namibia qualified for the World Cup by winning the 2018 Rugby Africa Gold Cup, defeating Kenya, who finished second and advanced to the repechage tournament.

Format

The Africa Cup, controlled by Rugby Africa (CAR), will be the regional qualification tournament for Rugby World Cup 2019.

The first qualifying round was the 2016 1B and 1C Divisions. The winner of Division 1C was promoted to 1B and the second round of qualifying, while the team placed bottom in 1B was relegated and eliminated from Rugby World Cup contention.

Similarly, 2017 saw Divisions 1A (Gold Cup) and 1B (Silver Cup) act as Round 2. The winner of the 2017 Silver Cup advanced to the Gold Cup for 2018 and remain in contention, while the loser of the 2017 Gold Cup was relegated to the 2018 Silver Cup and eliminated from Rugby World Cup contention.

In Round 3, the winners of the 2018 Gold Cup will qualify for the World Cup as 'Africa 1', while the runner-up, 'Africa 2' will advance to the Repechage tournament as the African representative.

Entrants
Fourteen teams competed during for the 2019 Rugby World Cup – African qualification; teams world rankings are prior to the first African qualification match on 12 June 2016 and bold nations denotes teams have previously played in a Rugby World Cup.

Round 1

The first round consisted of ten matches between 10 teams. The winner of the Africa Cup Division 1C, Morocco, advanced to the second round and was promoted to division 1B for 2017, while the two winners of division 1B, Senegal and Tunisia, advanced to division 1A.

Round 1A: 2016 Africa Cup Division 1B
Africa Cup Division 1B was contested by six teams, in a two-group round-robin tournament. Pool 1 was held in Monastir, Tunisia, while Pool 2 was held in Antananarivo, Madagascar. The team with the worst record was relegated to Division 1C in 2017, and thus eliminated from qualification.

Pool A

Pool B

Final
The two pool winners contested the final, with both teams advancing to the 2017 Africa Gold Cup.

Round 1B: 2016 Africa Cup Division 1C
Africa Cup Division 1C was contested by three teams in a round-robin tournament. Cameroon were meant to compete but withdrew from the tournament after it was rescheduled for a later date. The tournament was held in Casablanca, Morocco.

Round 2

The second round will see the five highest finishers of the six teams in the Gold Cup, Kenya, Namibia, Tunisia, Uganda and Zimbabwe, progress to the 2018 Gold Cup, with the last place side, Senegal, relegated to the Silver Division and eliminated from World Cup qualification. The Winner of Silver Cup, Morocco, was the first team to earn their place in the 2018 Gold Cup.

Round 2A: 2017 Africa Gold Cup

Round 2B: 2017 Africa Silver Cup
The 2017 Africa Silver Cup was contested by four teams in a knockout format. The tournament was held in Casablanca, Morocco.

Round 3: 2018 Africa Gold Cup

Six teams will contest the 2018 Rugby Africa Gold Cup and the final round of the African qualification, with the winner qualifying as Africa 1. The second placed team, Africa 2, will advance to the repechage tournament.

References

2019
Africa
2016 in African rugby union
2017 in African rugby union
2018 in African rugby union